Norwegian County Road 774 is a  long county road in the municipality of Levanger in Trøndelag county, Norway.  It begins at the junction with the European route E06 highway at the village of Mule.  It then heads into and through parts of the town of Levanger. There, the road continues as the Levanger–Hokstad Ferry operated by Tide Sjø to the village of Hokstad on the island of Ytterøya. After the ferry, the road changes to Norwegian County Road 135.

Before 1 January 2010, it was known as Norwegian national road 774 (Riksvei 774), but control was transferred to the county so now it is a Norwegian county road (Fylkesvei).

Path from east to west
 ← Mule (eastern terminus)
 Levangselva bridge
 to Kirkegata in the town of Levanger
 Levanger–Hokstad Ferry with service to the island of Ytterøya (11 trips per day, 30 minute voyage)
← (western terminus)

References

774
Levanger